Re:Born is a 2016 Japanese action film directed by Yûji Shimomura and starring Tak Sakaguchi (as TAK∴). It's about Toshiro, a legendary covert soldier with a mysterious past who decides to use his supernatural powers to defend what he cares about.

Overview 
Toshiro, a former mercenary, confronts a war that moves behind the scenes of everyday life and his remaining mission. While living with the girl Sachi, Toshiro commits himself to a fierce battle with a number of thugs aiming for himself. These mercenaries are led by Phantom, the boss of the unit he once belonged to, and his former partner warrior Abyss Walker.

Starring TAK∴ (Tak Sakaguchi), Yura Kondo, Takumi Saitoh, Hitomi Hasebe, Mariko Shinoda, Masaya Kato, Issei Ishida, Akio Otsuka, etc. In addition, Benio Saeki, Kenji Kawai, Kenji Shibasaki, Takahisa Notomi, etc. are listed as staff, and it is an unusual cast for an independent film.

As a feature of this film, hand-to-hand combat, which is rare in Japanese movies, is used for action, and TAK∴, who played the leading role, is the founder of "Zero Range Combat" and the tactical supervisor of this work. After studying under Yoshitaka Inagawa, he learned the unique movement of "wave" and techniques after about a year of training.

The production theme of this work is TAK∴'s return to acting, but at the same time, the director's thought that people with techniques and roles that are not originally exposed can be expressed in the film.

Release 
Re:Born had its world premiere at the 2016 Bucheon International Fantastic Film Festival. The film had its North American premiere at Fantastic Fest in 2016. It was released in Japan on August 12, 2017 (Heisei 29).

Reception 
Mark Schilling (The Japan Times) stated that Sakaguchi is "still a convincingly lethal presence", while noting that the film's plot was similar to a video game wherein the protagonist faces a series of bosses, and that attempts by scriptwriter Benio Saeki to expand on that premise felt forced.

References

External links 

Japanese action films
Films scored by Kenji Kawai
2016 action films
2010s Japanese films